Emma Broze (born 20 August 1995) is a French professional golfer who plays on the U.S.-based Epson Tour where she won the 2021 Danielle Downey Credit Union Classic. As an amateur, she won the 2014 European Ladies' Team Championship.

Amateur career
Broze was born in Feurs and grew up in Nervieux in the department of Loire, France. She had a successful amateur career and won the 2011 Championnat de France Minimes Filles, and in 2013 she won the German International Ladies Amateur Championship, the Trophee des Regions, and the Championnat de France Cadets. She was also runner-up at the Coupe de France Dames. Broze qualified for the 2016 Ladies' British Open Amateur Championship at Dundonald Links in Scotland.

Broze joined the French National Team in 2010 and represented her country in over 50 events. She captured silver at the 2013 European Girls' Team Championship at Linköping Golf Club, beaten by Sweden in the final. She was a member of the French squad that won the 2014 European Ladies' Team Championship in Slovenia, beating Matilda Castren 1 up in the final for France to win by 4.5–2.5 over Finland. Broze scored 3–0 in singles play during the event. At the 2018 European Ladies' Team Championship in Austria, Broze lost her single in the final to Linn Grant, 3 and 1, and France lost the final to Sweden by 5–2.

She represented France together with Agathe Laisné and Pauline Roussin-Bouchard at the 2018 Espirito Santo Trophy in Ireland, the 28th women's golf World Amateur Team Championship.

Broze attended Oklahoma State University and played with the Oklahoma State Cowgirls golf team between 2014 and 2018, finishing 12th in the NCAA Championship her senior year. She was named All-Big 10 Conference selection her freshman and junior years.

Professional career
Broze turned professional in 2020 and played on the Women's All Pro Tour before joining the Symetra Tour in 2021. In her rookie season, she won the Danielle Downey Credit Union Classic and made eight cuts in 12 events.

Amateur wins
2011 Championnat de France Minimes Filles 
2013 German International Ladies Amateur Championship, Trophee des Regions, Championnat de France Cadets

Source:

Professional wins (1)

Epson Tour wins (1)

^ Reduced to 36 holes due to rain

Team appearances
Amateur
European Young Masters (representing France): 2011
European Girls' Team Championship (representing France): 2013
European Ladies' Team Championship (representing France): 2014 (winners), 2016, 2018
Espirito Santo Trophy (representing France): 2018

References

External links

French female golfers
Oklahoma State Cowgirls golfers
Sportspeople from Loire (department)
1995 births
Living people
21st-century French women